Sheikh Salem Al-Ali Al-Salem Al-Sabah (born 1926) is the most senior serving member and Sheikh of the House of Sabah and the only commander in the half-century history of the Kuwait National Guard.

Early life and education 
Sheikh Salem is the eldest son of Sheikh Ali Salem Al-Mubarak Al-Sabah (1898–1928) and was born in Fereej Al-Shuyouk in the designated area of Wast.

Career

Construction and development (1950–1960) 
Salem debuted his career in the construction and development of the country during the discovery of oil in the 1950s; through its monetary revenue, Kuwait started to witness and experience an industrial growth on all levels around the country. Since then, Salem enlisted in the general public work sector, well before the forming of the Government of Kuwait, partaking and leading many development projects roles that were designed to build contemporary Kuwait in addition to setting the corps foundations of lifestyle and way of life in contemporary society today.

During the early 1950s, Salem worked closely with Fahed Salem Al-Mubarak Al-Sabah, Director of Public Works and the Municipality. He assumed the role of deputy director of His Excellency's offices for the both until 1959. During the same year, Salem headed the construction council and was in charge of planning and development, a very important post during the developing period of Kuwait. During that important time, Salem headed to his turn the Directorate of Public Works which was heavily concentrated on executing the major construction projects that founded today's Kuwait.

During the early 1960s prior to the independence of Kuwait, Salem was appointed as director of the town council, when it was enacting its governing laws that would appoint a member of the House of Sabah at its head and organize the development of the country, preservation of public health, preservation of the environment, hygiene, greenery and set the pace for the development of pillar infrastructures.

Independence 1961 

Following the independence of Kuwait in 1961, Salem was a prime board member in the founding council that was tasked in formilzing and preparing the Constitution of Kuwait and headed the first Ministry of Public Works in the first Government of Kuwait formed following the independence in 1961 and the second government formed in 1963 respectively. Salem's ministerial participation and initial contribution led also to the enacting of the first legislative term of the National Assembly of Kuwait.

Kuwait National Guard Patron 
The founding of the Kuwait National Guard was first conceived during the Six-Day War and following Operation Vantage when Jaber Al-Ahmad Al-Sabah was the Crown Prince of Kuwait through the 2nd Decree of 1967 on June 6 during the reign of Sabah Al-Salim Al-Sabah. A mission for this purpose was led by Salem Ali Al-Salem Al-Sabah. He formed and allocated training and development responsibilities amongst the various task forces within the National Guard and remained at the head of the institution since its enacting in 1967.

2006 dynastic succession  

Following the death of the late Emir Jaber Al-Ahmad Al-Jaber Al-Sabah, Salem drew significant attention supporting Saad Al-Abdullah Al-Salim Al-Sabah, the previous crown prince, to succeed Jaber. Saad was not eligible to be the Emir due to challenging health circumstances. Accordingly, the majority of the royal family agreed to nominate Sabah Al-Ahmad Al-Jaber Al-Sabah. This dynastic dispute lasted for about 8 days before Salem agreed to support the nomination of Sabah Al-Ahmad Al-Jaber Al-Sabah as Emir.

Other significant positions  
Salem assumed many positions within the Government of Kuwait.
 First Honorary President of the Society of Engineers.
 Deputy Director of Municipality and Public Works 1956.
 President of the Construction Council in 1959.
 Director of the Municipal Council in 1960.
 Minister of Public Works (1962–1964).

In addition, the mission and responsibility of founding the Kuwait National Guard has always been his most important endeavor and still remains his primary concern.

Humanitarian and charity missions 

Salem provided contributions in humanitarian missions in and outside the territory of Kuwait.

Personal life 

Salem has several sons and daughters.

See also 

 List of emirs of Kuwait
 Battle of Al-Regeai
 Ali Al Salem Air Base
 Fahad Al-Ahmed Al-Jaber Al-Sabah
 Mubarak Abdullah Al-Jaber Al-Sabah

References

External links 

Al Sabah: History and Genealogy of Kuwait’s Ruling Family 1752-1987 - by Alan Rush - (Ithaca Press, 1987)

Kuwaiti politicians
House of Al-Sabah
Living people
1926 births